Gary Sherrer may refer to:
 Gary Sherrer (Oklahoma politician)
 Gary Sherrer (Kansas politician)